Capital Citybus was a bus operator in London operating services under contract to London Regional Transport.

History

Capital Citybus was established on 29 December 1990, with the purchase of the London tendered bus services of Ensignbus by the Hong Kong businessman Tsui Tsin-tong's CNT Group, which also owned bus operator Citybus.

Citybus purchased the London tendered routes, Dagenham garage and 87 buses and rebranded the operation as Capital Citybus. In 1991, it gained a large number of routes after the collapse of London Regional Transport subsidiary London Forest and further tendering and opened Northumberland Park garage.

Capital Citybus also operated six commercial routes, mainly in the Romford area, and Hertfordshire County Council-contracted service 321 (Rickmansworth - Luton) on Sundays.

On 21 December 1995, CNT Group sold Capital Citybus in a buy-in management buyout backed by Lloyds Development Capital.

On 8 July 1998, Capital Citybus was sold to FirstGroup. After a period of initially operating separately, the company was integrated into the other First London operations.

Liveries
As Capital Citybus originated from Ensign, the fleet experienced several livery iterations from their inherited blue and silver scheme, starting out as merely Ensign blue/silver vehicles with Ensign Citybus fleetnames painted over where the Ensignbus name was, into variations of yellow and silver.

The company settled on an allover yellow livery with stylised C logos either side of the destination blind on the front of the bus. Initially buses had red fleetnames incorporating the Chinese characters "城巴" (Citybus) and the stylised C with the Capital Citybus name, along with taglines such as "moving comfortably ahead" and "here today... here tomorrow". After the sale of the company to its management, the fleetname was subsequently modified to just Capital Citybus. with the Chinese characters and stylised C phased out.

Capital Citybus was a frequent contractor for British Rail and London Underground replacement service work, and during its existence operated specially liveried vehicles for Docklands Light Railway and the East London Line replacement services.

As the regulations changed regarding London tendered service liveries, a revised mainly red livery was introduced.

As the company passed into First ownership, for a time there existed a subtly different First Capital red and yellow livery with the First Group flying f replacing the Citybus C on the front of buses, and First Capital replacing the Capital Citybus. Only the frontal f remained in an allover red First livery.

References

External links

London Bus Routes gallery
Showbus gallery
Thurrock Transport gallery

Former London bus operators
1990 establishments in England
1998 disestablishments in England